Events from the year 1957 in South Korea.

Incumbents
President: Rhee Syng-man
Vice President: Chang Myon

Events

Births

 June 2 - Djong Victorin Yu
 April 5 - Insooni
 April 7 - Kim Kap-soo, Kim Soo-chul
 November 6 - Kim Ki-taek

Death
October 10-Choe Nam-seon

See also
List of South Korean films of 1957
Years in Japan
Years in North Korea

References

 
South Korea
Years of the 20th century in South Korea
1950s in South Korea
South Korea